Yetunde Barnabas is a Nigerian model, beauty queen, actress and film producer. She initially gained recognition as the winner of The Most Beautiful Girl in Abuja pageant in 2017 and was crowned Miss Tourism Nigeria in 2019. She is best known for her role as Miss Pepeiye on Nigeria's long-running sitcom,  Papa Ajasco and Company, as well as several leading roles in the Yoruba movie industry.
She married Nigerian professional footballer Peter Olayinka who currently plays as a striker for Slavia Prague in Czech Republic.

Early life

Yetunde Barnabas was born on August 30, 1990, in Ilorin, Kwara state, though her family is originally from Kogi State. Barnabas grew up in Abuja, and after her secondary school education at the Kings of Kings Secondary School, she attended Seriki Olopolo Production and Royal Arts Academy where she honed her acting skills.

Career
Yetunde Barnabas began her modeling career when she registered for the Miss Olokun beauty pageant in 2013, a competition, which she went on to win. She also competed in other smaller pageants, including the Miss Live Your Dream in 2014, but it was her participation in the Most Beautiful Girl in Abuja pageant that gained her notoriety. In 2016, Barnabas registered for the 2017 Most Beautiful Girl in Abuja competition, which she won and as a result, she a national endorsement deal with Multichoice/DSTV. She was also made a brand ambassador for an Abuja-based estate management firm.

Barnabas leveraged on her newfound fame and auditioned for and was chosen for the role of Ms Pepeiye, an iconic character on one of Nigeria's longest-running television sitcoms, Papa Ajasco & Company. Since then she has featured in leading roles in several Nollywood film productions, including Erin Folami, Dagogo, Omo Iya Osun and Elegbenla, a film she featured alongside Niyi Johnson and Akin Olaiya.

Barnabas has also produced a few movie productions to her credit including the 2018 film, Omo Iya Osun, which had positive reviews.

Awards and recognition
In 2019, Yetunde Barnabas was nominated for the Most Promising Actress of the Year at the Nigerian Achiever's Awards in recognition of her various television and film roles within the year in review. Barnabas was also nominated for Model of the Year at the Scream Awards 2019 as well as Beauty Queen of the Year at the Africa Choice Awards.

In August 2019, Barnabas was selected, alongside other African models by the British Broadcasting Corporation (BBC), as part of a new beauty campaign tagged Ewatomi.

Personal life
In March 2021 she married Nigerian football player Peter Olayinka.

Filmography

Selected filmography

2017 - date - Papa Ajasco & Company
2017 - Alaya Imarun
2017 - Ede Meji
2018 - Lisa
2018 - Queen Mi
2018 - Omo Iya Osun
2019 - Oka ori ebe
2019 - Imule Aje
2019 - Lori Titi
2019 - Olode
2019 - Omije Afoju
2019 - Knockout
2019 - Dagogo
2019 - Aiye
2019 - Elegbenla
2019 - Bayonle
2019 - Erin Folami

References 

      10.      https://metronews247.co.uk/super-eagles-player-peter-olayinka-marries-gets-married-to-his-fiancee-yetunde-barnabas/  Metronews247 Media

Living people
Nigerian film producers
Yoruba actresses
Actresses in Yoruba cinema
21st-century Nigerian actresses
People from Ilorin
1990 births
Nigerian female models
Nigerian beauty pageant contestants
Nigerian television actresses
Nigerian women film producers
Nigerian film actresses
Association footballers' wives and girlfriends